Football Club Union Sportive Hostert A.s.b.l. is a football club, based in Hostert, Niederanven, in central Luxembourg. In 2011, the club was promoted to the highest tier for the first time in its history.

The club is also a home to many youth teams. These include the minimes, poussins, scolaires and peuppilles. The club hosts the AC Milan camp for youths as well as an international football camp.

Current squad

Managers
 Gordon Braun (2009–10)
 Luc Muller (March 16, 2010 – June 30, 2011)
 Carlos Texeira (July 1, 2011 – June 30, 2013)
 Manuel Peixoto (July 1, 2013–)

External links
US Hostert official website

Football clubs in Luxembourg
1946 establishments in Luxembourg